Sue Gafner (born 1964 in Erie, Pennsylvania) is a former professional female bodybuilder of the late 1980s and early 1990s.

Sue Gafner competed as an amateur in the light-weight competitive division for several years in the late 80s until she moved the middle weight class at the national class level of competitive bodybuilding in the early 90s. Gafner earned her pro card in 1990 by winning the middle weight class at the NPC Nationals. She competed as a professional from 1991 through 1993. She was the first winner of the Jan Tana Classic in 1991. As of 2008 she resides in the Tampa / St. Petersburg area of Florida where she lives with her husband while working as an independent management consultant specializing in financial compliance.

Biography
Sue Gafner was born in 1964 in Erie, Pennsylvania, United States. When she was young her family moved to Albuquerque, New Mexico where she grew up, and eventually moved to Southern California where she settled along with her family in Orange, California. At the age of 23 in January 1987, she was introduced to weight training through the book Hard Bodies by Gladys Portugues and began to lift at a local gym (Brainum, 166). She took up weight training mainly to lose weight. During this time weight training was becoming a more and more popular with women and soon Gafner became very interested in it along with better nutritional practices. Her body responded quickly and before she knew it she got hooked on the bodybuilding life style. During this time she began following a stricter diet and soon began to think about competition. Gafner gathered her training knowledge from a variety of sources, including Hard Bodies and received guidance from some of the members at her gym who offered her tips on training and dieting.

She finally decided to compete after three months of training when people at her him began suggesting that she should try competition. Gafner decided to do so and in April 1987 she entered her first contest. She won her class at the 1987 Palm Springs Muscle Classic Novice contest, and followed her debut with a victory at the 1987 Tournament of Champions where she won both her class and overall. She continued training, but ran into trouble due to her lack of knowledge about dieting and exercise and often overtrained (Brainum, 223). This soon changed when Gafner joined with a more experienced bodybuilder named Lisa Hitchens. Hitchens taught Gafner about how to train properly and this was very helpful for Gafner and it showed in her competition. Gafner placed 1st in the light weight division at the 1988 USA Championships and 2nd on the 1989 NPC Nationals. She later decided to enter the middle weight class and placed 1st at the NPC Nationals, earning her Pro card in only a three-year period. She continued to compete meanwhile she managed her own wall-papering business and worked as a wall-paper hanger.

After becoming a pro, Gafner had a brief career in the pro circuit. She arrived at a time where Women's Bodybuilding was going through a transition where bigger was better. And like many women bodybuilders of the 1980s she refused to follow with the trend of gaining large levels of muscle mass in order to compete and be successful in the sport were once small frames were considered better. And while she was very successful at the NPC level where she placed no lower than 2nd, she soon found herself lost at the IFBB were heavier athletes were winning the shows. She placed 10th at her first Ms. Olympia competition and 12th the second time and after reaching the top-five at her second 1993 Ms. International, she retired from the sport entirely. This came as a result of her lack of desire to use large amounts of steroids such as growth hormones in order to compete and be successful at a pro level. Today it is believed that like many other professional bodybuilders, Gafner has started her own personal training business and is living peacefully in California.

Gafner stands out from other female professional bodybuilders for been a great speaker about the bodybuilding lifestyle and for always promoting the benefits of bodybuilding outside of competing. "Bodybuilding has allowed me mold my body into the shape I want, that's why I do it, and will continue to train regardless of whether I compete or not. Bodybuilding makes me feel good about myself, and that's what's important" (Brainum, 226). Gafner's only IFBB Pro, and most notable victory was the IFBB 1991 Jan Tana Classic.

Vital stats
Current residence: Florida
Occupation: bodybuilding competitor, personal trainer, fitness model, wallpaper hanger.
Height: 5 ft 2 in
Weight (in season): 108–120 lb; (off-season): 115–121 lb
Eye color: green
Hair color: red

Bodybuilding philosophy
Gafner's training mainly consisted of a combination compound, and isolation exercises (mostly done with free weights and a small number of machines and cables). She trained with the traditional push and pull routine (three days on, one day off) and when contest preparations started, she switched to a four days on / one day off routine to focus more on different body parts. Gafner focuses on her chest, shoulders, back, and arms in order to bring up her upper body to match her strong legs (Brainum, 224). She rarely does Regular Squats with a free barbells due to a hip problem and focuses more on isolation exercises such as Hack Squats, Leg Presses, and Lunges (Brainum, 224). Sue believes that proper form is very important and often avoids extreme heavy weights. During the off-season she avoided any form of aerobic exercise to preserve her energy levels. When it came to contest season she would do at least one or two cardio sessions for four to five days due to her high metabolism.

Contest history
1987 NPC Palm Springs Muscle Classic Novice - 1st (LW)
1987 NPC Tournament of Champions - 1st (LW and Overall)
1988 NPC California State Championships - 2nd (LW)
1988 NPC USA Championships - 1st (LW)
1989 NPC Nationals - 2nd (LW)
1990 NPC Nationals - 1st (MW)
1990 IFBB World Amateur Championships - 2nd (MW)
1991 IFBB Ms. International - 6th
1991 IFBB Jan Tana Classic - 1st
1991 IFBB Ms. Olympia - 10th
1992 IFBB Ms. Olympia - 12th
1993 IFBB Ms. International - 4th

See also
List of female bodybuilders

References

Notes
Brainum, Jerry. Drug-free Light Weight Champ. California: Muscle & Fitness. June, 1989. . (Woodland Hills, California: I, Brute Enterprises inc., 1989.) Women Section: pages 164–166, 223–224, and 226 cover Sue Gafner's article.
Fitness, Johnny. Kim's Columbus. Nebraska: ''Robert Kennedy's Muscle Mag International. August, 1993. UPSPS 4601. (Lincoln, Nebraska: Canusa Products/Foote & Davies, 1993.) Contest News Section: pages 78, and 80 covers about Sue Gafner competing at the 1993 Ms. International.

External links
Sue Gafner
Muscle Memory: Sue Gafner Page

American female bodybuilders
1964 births
Living people
Professional bodybuilders
21st-century American women